James Buck (born October 31, 1948) is an American politician and engineer from Washington. Buck is a former Republican Party member of the Washington House of Representatives, representing the 24th district from 1995 to 2007. In 2006, Buck was defeated by Democrat Kevin Van De Wege.

Personal life 
Buck's wife is Donna Buck. They have two children. Buck and his family live in Joyce, Washington.

References 

1948 births
Living people
Republican Party members of the Washington House of Representatives
People from Clallam County, Washington
People from Mount Holly, New Jersey
20th-century American politicians
21st-century American politicians